was a Japanese princess during the Asuka period of Japanese history. She was a daughter of Emperor Tenmu, a wife of Prince Shiki and the mother of Prince Kasuga. She was a Saiō.

Genealogy
She was the daughter of Emperor Temmu and Lady Kajihime, whose father is Shishibito no Omi Ōmaro. Her siblings are Prince Osakabe, Princess Hatsusebe and Prince Shiki.

The first record on her is that she visited Ise Jingu Shrine to see the Saiō, Princess Ōku, in 686.

On the ninth month, tenth day of 698, she was selected by divination as the next Saio. The Saio system had been suspended since Princess Ōku resigned from the Saio in 686. Emperor Mommu wished to set up the system again and let a princess serve the Goddess of Ise at all times.

In the first month of 701, she was suddenly dismissed from the position of Saio. After she returned the capital she got married with Prince Shiki and gave birth to Prince Kasuga. She lived with her husband until he died in 716.

According to Nihon Shoki, she was conferred as the rank of Ippon on the fourth month, 14th day of 749.

References 

Japanese princesses
751 deaths
8th-century Japanese women
Year of birth unknown
Saigū
Daughters of emperors